Most of football clubs in Iran, notably Esteghlal and Persepolis, are fully funded and indirectly intervented by the government and military organizations.

Persian Gulf Pro League 2018-19

Azadegan League

References

owners